Stictopleurus subtomentosus is a species of scentless plant bugs belonging to the family Rhopalidae, subfamily Rhopalinae.

It is mainly found in France, Italy, Greece and Spain.

References

External links
 Fauna Europaea
 Biolib

Hemiptera of Europe
Insects described in 1888
Rhopalini